Archibald McNeill (died 1849) was a Congressional Representative from North Carolina; born in Moore County, North Carolina; member of the State House of Commons in 1808 and 1809; served in the State senate 1811–1813, 1820, and 1821; elected to the Seventeenth Congress (March 4, 1821 – March 3, 1823); elected to the Nineteenth Congress (March 4, 1825 – March 3, 1827); moved to the Republic of Texas in 1836; in 1849 raised and was chosen captain of about one hundred men who started for California, where gold had been discovered. Struck by a sandstorm while crossing a desert (in what is now Arizona), he and most of the men were killed; his remains were never recovered.

See also 
 Seventeenth United States Congress
 Nineteenth United States Congress

External links 
 U.S. Congress Biographical Directory entry

Members of the North Carolina House of Representatives
North Carolina state senators
1849 deaths
18th-century births
Federalist Party members of the United States House of Representatives from North Carolina
Jacksonian members of the United States House of Representatives from North Carolina
19th-century American politicians